Valiya Koonambaikulam temple or Valia Koonampayikulam temple is a Hindu temple located at Koonambaikulam near Vadakkevila in Kollam district of Kerala in India. This is one of the most ancient temples in Kerala and is dedicated to Bhadrakali (popularly known as
'Koonambaikulathamma', which means The mother of Koonambaikulam). The temple is under the control of Valiya Koonambaikulam Sree Bhadrakali Kshetra Trust. The trust owns an Engineering college called Valia Koonambaikulathamma College of Engineering and Technology (VKCET) at Parippally in Kollam district.

The daily worship at the temple begins at 04:00 and ends at 21:00 local time. An important annual festival of the temple is the 'Kumbha Bharani Maholsavam' which is held in the Bharani Nakshatra of Kumbham, the month corresponding to February or March in Kollam era. Thousands of women are participating in the Chandra Pongal ritual organised in connection with the festival every year.{ഇന്ത്യയിലെ കേരളത്തിലെ കൊല്ലം ജില്ലയിലെ വടക്കേവിള യ്ക്കടുത്തുള്ള കൂനമ്പായിക്കുളത്ത് സ്ഥിതിചെയ്യുന്ന ഒരു ഹിന്ദു ക്ഷേത്രമാണ് വലിയ കൂനമ്പായിക്കുളം ക്ഷേത്രം അല്ലെങ്കിൽ കൂനമ്പായിക്കുളം ക്ഷേത്രം (മലയാളം: പി. കേരളത്തിലെ ഏറ്റവും പുരാതനമായ ക്ഷേത്രങ്ങളിലൊന്നായ ഇത് ഭദ്രകാളിക്ക് സമർപ്പിച്ചിരിക്കുന്നു ('കൂനമ്പായിക്കുളത്തമ്മ' എന്നറിയപ്പെടുന്നു, അതായത് കൂനമ്പായിക്കുളത്തിന്റെ മാതാവ്). വലിയ കൂനമ്പായിക്കുളം ശ്രീ ഭദ്രകാളി ക്ഷത്ര ട്രസ്റ്റിന്റെ നിയന്ത്രണത്തിലാണ് ക്ഷേത്രം. കൊല്ലം ജില്ലയിലെ പരിപ്പള്ളിയിൽ വലിയ കൂനമ്പായിക്കുളത്തമ്മ കോളേജ് ഓഫ് എഞ്ചിനീയറിംഗ് ആൻഡ് ടെക്നോളജി (വി.കെ.സി.ഇ.ടി) എന്ന എഞ്ചിനീയറിംഗ് കോളേജ് ട്രസ്റ്റിന് സ്വന്തമാണ്. [1]

ക്ഷേത്രത്തിലെ ദൈനംദിന ആരാധന 04:00 ന് ആരംഭിച്ച് പ്രാദേശിക സമയം 21:00 ന് അവസാനിക്കും. കൊല്ലം കാലഘട്ടത്തിലെ ഫെബ്രുവരി അല്ലെങ്കിൽ മാർച്ചിനോടനുബന്ധിച്ചുള്ള മാസമായ കുംഭത്തിലെ ഭരണി നക്ഷത്രത്തിൽ നടക്കുന്ന 'കുംഭ ഭാരണി മഹോൽസവം' ആണ് ക്ഷേത്രത്തിലെ ഒരു പ്രധാന ഉത്സവം. ഉത്സവത്തോടനുബന്ധിച്ച് എല്ലാ വർഷവും സംഘടിപ്പിക്കുന്ന ചന്ദ്ര പൊങ്കൽ ആചാരത്തിൽ ആയിരക്കണക്കിന് സ്ത്രീകൾ പങ്കെടുക്കുന്നു.

References

External links 
 

Hindu temples in Kollam district
Devi temples in Kerala